Tyniec is a historic village in Poland on the Vistula river, since 1973 a part of the city of Kraków (currently in the district of Dębniki). Tyniec is notable for its Benedictine abbey founded by King Casimir the Restorer in 1044.

Etymology
The name of the village comes from a Celtic language word "tyn", which means wall or fence, and which means that the history of Tyniec as a fortified settlement (see gord) dates back to pre-Slavic times.

Geography

Furthermore, Tyniec has a Vistula canyon (called Tyniec Gate), a Skolczanka Nature Reserve (est. 1957), and a locally renowned water source, Zrodlo Swietojanskie, the only source of this kind in the city of Kraków. In ancient times the village was located along a merchant trade route from Kraków, via Oświęcim, to Moravia and Bohemia.

History
The history of human settlement in the area of the village dates back to the paleolithic period. On top of the Gora Klasztorna hill traces of a neolithic settlement were found. It had a ceramics work, there also was a mint, which manufactured silver Celtic coins.

Probably in the early 10th century, Tyniec was settled by the Vistulans, which some time ca. 1000 became part of the early Kingdom of Poland. The village was a royal property, and the decision of King Casimir the Restorer to locate a Benedictine abbey here (ca. 1040) is regarded as one of the most important events in the history of Tyniec. In 1259 the village was destroyed during the Mongol invasion of Poland, by Tatar hordes heading from Kraków towards Silesia. Complete destruction was brought again in the Swedish invasion of Poland. In 1772, during the Bar Confederation, the village was defended by the Polish rebels, fighting the Russians. After the Partitions of Poland, Tyniec, together with the abbey, was annexed by the Habsburg Empire, and remained in the province of Galicia from 1772 until late 1918. In 1816, Austrian authorities closed down the abbey, and the complex gradually began to turn into a ruin.

In the 19th century, Tyniec was a large, yet poor village. Its houses were concentrated in two areas – around the monastery, and along the ancient Kraków – Oświęcim road. Its residents supported themselves by transporting people and goods through the Vistula in their boats and small ferries. In 1973 Tyniec was annexed by the city of Kraków.

Cyrillo-Methodian monastery
Historically, and prior to the arrival of the Roman Catholics, the monks at Tyniec were part of the Cyrillo-Methodian Christian tradition. The Cyrillo-Methodian monks were succeeded by the Benedictines. The Cyrillo-Methodian tradition had begun in Moravia in the year 862. Brothers, Cyril and Methodius, were missionaries who established Christianity in the vernacular for Moravian Slavs. This practice quickly spread throughout the region and into the areas which are now in Poland. Tyniec monks performed the liturgy and read the psalms and Gospels in the Proto-Slavic tongue derived from this period. In 1096, the Monks of Tyniec were expelled and the Roman Catholic approved Slavonic Rite Mass suppressed. These expulsions coincided with the rule of Polish Duke Władysław I Herman, who attributed the birth of his first boy to the help of the Benedictines of Saint Gilles in southern France to whom he had earlier sent great riches asking for intercession for the birth of a healthy child. The expulsions paralleled events in almost the same year throughout the region, most notably at the Sazava Monastery where the Slavonic Rite Mass was also still in use as in Tyniec. There, the Cyrillo-Methodian Sazawa monks were also expelled and replaced with monks of the Latin rite. These expulsions at Sazawa coincided with the rule of the Duke of Bohemia, Bretislaus II.

Benedictine abbey

It is not known when exactly the Benedictine abbey was founded. King Casimir the Restorer is speculated to have re-established the Abbey in 1040 during his rebuilding of the newly established Kingdom of Poland, after a Pagan rebellion and a disastrous raid of Duke Bretislaus I (1039).

The Benedictines, invited to Tyniec by King Casimir the Restorer, were tasked with restoring order as well as cementing the position of the State and the Church. The first Tyniec Abbot was Aaron, who became the Bishop of Kraków. Since there is no conclusive evidence to support the foundation date as of 1040, some historians claim that the current abbey was founded by Casimir the Restorer's son, King Boleslaw II the Generous.

In the second half of the 11th century, a complex of Romanesque buildings was completed, consisting of a basilica and the abbey. In the 14th century, it was destroyed in Tatar and Czech raids, and in the 15th century it was rebuilt in Gothic style. Further reconstruction took place in the 17th and 18th centuries, first in Baroque, then in Rococo style. The abbey was partly destroyed in the Swedish invasion of Poland, and soon after it was rebuilt, with a new library. Further destruction took place during the Bar Confederation, when Polish rebels turned the abbey into their fortress.

In 1816, Austrian authorities liquidated the abbey, and in 1821–1826, it was the seat of the Bishop of Tyniec, Gregorius Thomas Ziegler former monk in Tyniec. The monks, however, did not return to the abbey until 1939, and in 1947, remodelling of the neglected complex was initiated. In 1968, the Church of St. Peter and Paul was once again named the seat of the abbot. The church itself consists of a Gothic presbytery and a Baroque main nave. Several altars were created by an 18th-century Italian sculptor Francesco Placidi. The church also has a late Baroque pulpit by Franciszek Jozef Mangoldt.

For more than a century, the abbey had remained unoccupied. Only in the last days of July 1939, a month before the outbreak of World War II, eleven Belgian monks moved into it.

Gallery

See also
The Lesser Polish Way
Vistula

References

External links
 Benedictine Abbey in Tyniec

Districts of Kraków